Chope's Town Cafe and Bar, in La Mesa, New Mexico, was listed on the National Register of Historic Places in 2015.

It was established as a restaurant in 1915 by Longina and Margarito Benavides, when Longina began selling her enchiladas to locals.  It was named for José "Chope" Benavides, their son, who took over in the 1940s.  He wore chopos (overalls) often.

It was founded by Chope and Lupe Benavidez.

It is located at 16145 New Mexico State Road 28.

References

National Register of Historic Places in Doña Ana County, New Mexico
Buildings and structures completed in 1915